Gideon Jacobus Kruis (born 9 May 1974), popularly known as Deon Kruis, is a South African first-class cricketer who played in England with Yorkshire County Cricket Club for five seasons from 2004 to 2009. His South African cricket has been for Northern Transvaal, Griqualand West and Eagles.

He is a right-handed batsman, and bowls right-arm fast-medium. At the end of the 2006 season he was one of Yorkshire's more successful bowlers helping them stay in Division 1 of the County Championship.

Kruis retired at the end of the 2009 season.

References

South African cricketers
Yorkshire cricketers
1974 births
Living people
Cricketers from Pretoria
Marylebone Cricket Club cricketers